Kai Olé is an album by jazz trombonist and arranger Kai Winding recorded in 1961 for the Verve label.

Reception

The Allmusic review by Tony Wilds observed "Before Herb Alpert provided the hit transition from Latin brass to mod brass, Winding made this deluxe gatefold mod/Latin/jazz album. Surprisingly, Latin percussion yields him a lot more freedom than the yet more rigid big beat of the later, near-rock, mod sound. ...Kai Ole uniquely explores a new area of Latin jazz but never quite reaches critical mass".

Track listing
 "Hacia el Fin de la Terra (To The Ends Of The Earth)" (Noel Sherman, Joe Sherman) - 2:49
 "Amor" (Gabriel Ruiz, the original Spanish lyrics  by Ricardo López Méndez) - 2:42
 "Them There Ojos (Them There Eyes)" (Maceo Pinkard, Doris Tauber and William Tracey) - 2:20
 "Caribe" (Kai Winding) - 2:42
 "Esto Es Felicidad" (Bobby Collazo, José Carbó Menéndez, Orlando De LaRosa) - 2:39
 "Manteca" (Dizzy Gillespie, Chano Pozo, Gil Fuller) - 2:45
 "Hojas de Otoño (Autumn Leaves)" (Joseph Kosma, Johnny Mercer) - 3:03
 "Dansero"  (Lee Daniels, Richard Hayman, Sol Parker) - 2:50
 "Que Pasa?" (Winding) - 2:39
 "Bésame Mucho" (Consuelo Velázquez) - 2:49
 "Adios" (Enric Madriguera, Eddie Woods) - 2:23
 "Surrey with the Fringe Arriba (Surrey with the Fringe on Top)" (Richard Rodgers, Oscar Hammerstein II) - 2:46

Personnel 
Kai Winding, Billy Byers - trombone, arranger
Joe Newman, Doc Severinsen - trumpet
Clark Terry - flugelhorn
Tony Studd, George West - bass trombone 
Phil Woods - alto saxophone
Danny Bank - baritone saxophone, clarinet
Ross Tompkins - piano
Harold Gaylor - bass
Ray Rodriguez - bongos
Other unidentified musicians

References 

1961 albums
Verve Records albums
Kai Winding albums
Albums produced by Creed Taylor